In Search of Lost Time is a 2022 Chinese historical drama film co-written and directed by Derek Yee and starring Chen Baoguo, Ma Su, Ayanga, and Wang Qiang. Based on real events of "Three Thousand Orphans Entering Inner Mongolia", the film is about a group of nearly 3,000 junior orphans who were sent to the Mongolian grasslands to be adopted by nomadic families. The film premiered in China on 9 September 2022.

Cast
Chen Baoguo as Du Sihan
Ai Mi as young Du Siheng
Luo Yichun as childhood Du Siheng
Badema as old Du Siheng
Ma Su as Sa Renna
Ayanga as Edel 
Wang Qiang as Namu Khan
Luo Yichun
Wang Churan as young Zhang Fengxia
Li Bin as old Zhang Fengxia
 as Zhao Mingna
Xu Huanshan as Deng Xianfeng
 as young Deng Xianfeng
Zhang Ming'en as Du Yi
 as Ma Zhengyuan
Bayin
Batdorj-in Baasanjab

Production
Shooting began on 15 April 2021 at Hengdian World Studios and took place in various locations including Hohhot, Xilingol League, and Wulagai Ranch, and wrapped on August 9.

Release
In Search of Lost Timewas theatrically released on 9 September 2022 in China.

Reception
Douban, a major Chinese media rating site, the film has scored 7.2 out of 10.

References

External links

2022 films
Mandarin-language films
Mongolian-language films
Chinese historical drama films
Films shot in Inner Mongolia
Films set in Inner Mongolia
Drama films based on actual events
Films set in the 1960s